João Cabral de Melo Neto (January 6, 1920 – October 9, 1999) was a Brazilian poet and diplomat, and one of the most influential writers in late Brazilian modernism. He was awarded the 1990 Camões Prize and the 1992 Neustadt International Prize for Literature, the only Brazilian poet to receive such award to date. He was considered until his death a perennial competitor for the Nobel Prize in Literature.

Melo Neto's works are noted for the rigorous, yet inventive attention they pay to the formal aspects of poetry. He derives his characteristic sound from a traditional verse of five or seven syllables (called ‘’redondilha’’) and from the constant use of oblique rhymes. His style ranges from the surrealist tendency which marked his early poetry to the use of regional elements of his native northeastern Brazil. In many works, including the famed auto Morte e Vida Severina, Melo Neto's addresses the life of those affected by the poverty and inequality in Pernambuco.

Life and career 
Melo Neto was born in Recife, Pernambuco, and spent most of his youth in his family's sugar-cane mills in the interior of the state. He was a cousin of distinguished poet Manuel Bandeira and sociologist Gilberto Freyre. In 1940, his family moved to Rio de Janeiro.

Two years later, Melo Neto published his first book of poems, Pedra do Sono, from his own expense, with a circulation of 340 copies. In 1945, he applied to the post of diplomat, a position he would hold for most of his life. The following year, he married Stella Maria Barbosa de Oliveira, with whom he had five children.

After passing through several different countries, he became consul of Brazil in Porto in 1984, only returning to Rio de Janeiro three years later. He worked for many years in Spain, and his experiences in Seville would leave palpable influences in his poetry.

In 1956, Melo Neto published his most famous work, Morte e Vida Severina, and, in 1968, he was elected to the 37th chair of the Brazilian Academy of Letters.

In 1986, he married Marly de Oliveira and, two years later, he retired, resigning from his office as ambassador. Melo Neto died in 1999, in Rio de Janeiro. In a career spanning more than fifty years, Melo Neto published 18 books of poetry and two plays.

Poetry
{{Cquote|Poetry is not the product of inspiration triggered by feeling, but the product of the poet's patient and lucid work.<ref>A poesia não é fruto de inspiração em razão do sentimento”, mas o “fruto do trabalho paciente e lúcido do poeta”. Quoted in: http://www.reciclazaro.org.br/conheca-a-historia-do-poeta-brasileiro-joao-cabral-de-melo-neto/</ref>}}

The image of an engineer designing a building, an epithet Melo Neto himself adopted, is often used to describe his poetry. From the start, his poetry was extraordinarily rich in imagery. Commenting Pedra do Sono, his first book, Antonio Candido, who noted his debt to cubism and surrealism, observed how his poems were composed from the accumulation of concrete and sensory images, using words in an almost pictorial manner.

Quickly, however, he proved highly attentive to the social reality of his state. In O cão sem plumas (“A Dog without Feathers”)’, his first long poem, dated from 1950, he portrayed the lives of the destitute classes, who depended on the Capibaribe River, and described the toiling of the sugar-cane mill. Three years later, in O Rio (“The River”) he assumed the voice of the river, narrating in first-person its course and the villages and landscapes it crossed.

Clarifying his debts to Melo Neto, Augusto de Campos has said: “One might say that he has no antecedents in Brazilian poetry, but his work has consequences. It is Concrete poetry that will sustain, continue, expand and broaden this poetic language that is not sentimental, but objective, a poetry of concretude, a critical poetry, as João's poetry is.”

Works

Poetry
 1942: Pedra do Sono (Slumber Stone)
 1943: Os Três Mal-Amados (The Three Unloved)
 1945: O Engenheiro (The Engineer)
 1947: Psicologia da Composição com a Fábula de Anfion e Antiode (Psychology of Composition with the Fable of Amphion and Anti-Ode)
 1950: O Cão sem Plumas (The Dog without Feathers)
 1953: O Rio ou Relação da Viagem que Faz o Capibaribe de Sua Nascente à Cidade do Recife (The River or On the Course of the Capibaribe River from Its Source to the City of Recife)
 1960: Dois Parlamentos (Two Parliaments)
 1960: Quaderna
 1966: A Educação pela Pedra (Education by the Stone)
 1975: Museu de Tudo (Museum of Everything)
 1980: A Escola das Facas (The School of the Knives)
 1985: Agrestes
 1987: Crime na Calle Relator (Crime in Relator Street)
 1990: Primeiros Poemas (First Poems)
 1990: Sevilha Andando (Walking around Seville)

Autos
1955: Morte e Vida Severina (translated in part by Elizabeth Bishop as Life and Death of a Severino)
1984: Auto do Frade (Auto of the Frair)

Further readingEnglishEducation by Stone: Selected Poems / João Cabral de Melo Neto;  translated by Richard Zenith, 2005
Selected Poetry, 1937-1990 / João Cabral de Melo Neto;  translated by Djelal Kadir, 1994
The Aesthetics of the Object in the Poetry of João Cabral de Melo Neto / Marta Peixoto, 1977
The Poem and the Canvas: Pictorial Implications in the Works of João Cabral de Melo Neto / Danilo Pinto Lôbo, 1972
João Cabral de Melo Neto / Benedito Nunes, 1971PortugueseJoão Cabral de Melo Neto e a Estratégia do Equilíbrio / Stephen Bocskay, 2013 
João Cabral de Melo Neto : o homem sem alma; Diário de tudo / José Castello., 2006
Tradição e ruptura: João Cabral de Melo Neto em Barcelona, 1947-1950 / Nicolás Fernández-Medina., 2005.
Os signos de uma educação : a água e a pedra na poética de João Cabral de Melo Neto / Walter Filho., 2003
O poeta e a mídia : Carlos Drummond de Andrade e João Cabral de Melo Neto / Fábio Lucas., 2002
O poema no sistema : a peculiaridade do antilírico João Cabral na poesia brasileira / Homero Araújo., 2002
João Cabral e o poema dramático, Auto do frade / Níobe Abreu Peixoto., 2001
João Cabral de Melo Neto / João Alexandre Barbosa., 2001
A poesia crítica de João Cabral de Melo Neto / Helton Gonçalves de Souza., 1999
João Cabral : a poesia do menos e outros ensaios cabralinos / Antonio Carlos Secchin., 1999
João Cabral de Melo Neto : o homem sem alma / José Castello., 1996
A bailadora andaluza : a explosão do sagrado na poesia de João Cabral / Waldecy Tenório., 1996
João Cabral em perspectiva / Maria do Carmo Campos., 1995
Lira e antilira : Mário, Drummond, Cabral / Luiz Costa Lima., 1995
Manuel e João : dois poetas pernambucanos / Assis Brasil., 1990
Idéias fixas de João Cabral de Melo Neto / Félix de Athayde., 1998
A Viagem ou Itinerário que fez João Cabral de Melo Neto do Racionalismo ao Materialismo Dialético / Félix de Athayde., 2000Spanish''
Piedra fundamental : poesia y prosa / João Cabral de Melo Neto., 2002
A la medida de la mano / Angel Crespo., 1994

References

External links
 Academia Brasileira de Letras profile of João Cabral de Melo Neto
Encyclopædia Britannica Joao Cabral de Melo Neto

1920 births
1999 deaths
20th-century Brazilian poets
Brazilian male poets
Brazilian diplomats
Brazilian expatriates in Spain
Camões Prize winners
Members of the Brazilian Academy of Letters
20th-century Brazilian male writers
Brazilian expatriates in Portugal